The Minister for Youth Policies (Italian: Ministro per le Politiche Giovanili) is one of the positions in the Cabinet of Italy.

The current minister is Andrea Abodi, an independent politician, who held the office since 22 October 2022.

List of Ministers
 Parties
2006–present:

 Coalitions
2006–present:

References

Youth